AnimalTFDB is a comprehensive database of transcription factors.

See also
 transcription factors

References

External links
 https://web.archive.org/web/20120119015359/http://www.bioguo.org/AnimalTFDB/.

Biological databases
Transcription factors